Acraea utengulensis, the Tanzanian fiery acraea, is a butterfly in the family Nymphalidae. It is found in northern and central Tanzania and Zambia.

Taxonomy
Acraea utengulensis is a member of the Acraea acrita species group. The clade members are:
 
Acraea utengulensis 
Acraea acrita
Acraea chaeribula
Acraea eltringhamiana
Acraea guluensis
Acraea lualabae
Acraea manca 
Acraea pudorina

Treated as a form of Acraea pudorina by Per Olof Christopher Aurivillius in Adalbert Seitz's Die Gross-Schmetterlinge der Erde (in English: The Macrolepidoptera of the World) (1907). See the Acraea acrita species complex.

Classification of Acraea by Henning, Henning & Williams, Pierre. J. & Bernaud

Acraea (group acrita) Henning, 1993 
Acraea (Rubraea) Henning & Williams, 2010  
Acraea (Acraea) (subgroup acrita) Pierre & Bernaud, 2013
Acraea (Acraea)  Groupe egina Pierre & Bernaud, 2014

References

External links

Images representing Acraea utengulensis at Bold.

Butterflies described in 1903
utengulensis
Butterflies of Africa